Tomer Hanuka (born 1974) is an illustrator and cartoonist.

Biography 
At age twenty-two, Hanuka moved to New York City. Following his graduation from the School of Visual Arts in 2000, he quickly became a regular contributor to many national magazines. His clients include Time Magazine, The New Yorker, Spin, The New York Times, Rolling Stone, MTV, and Saatchi & Saatchi. He is the winner of multiple medals from the Society of Illustrators and the Society of Publication Designers as well as American Illustration and Print magazine.

Tomer co-creates Bipolar with his identical twin brother Asaf for Alternative Comics. Bipolar is an experimental comic book series for which Tomer was nominated for the Eisner, Harvey and Ignatz awards. In 2006, Tomer published The Placebo Man (Alternative Comics), which compiles much of his work from Bipolar. He currently lives in New York City.

Published books

The Divine, 2015 

The Divine is a graphic novel written by Boaz Lavie and illustrated by Tomer and his brother Asaf. Mark, an explosives expert who, despite his better judgment, signs onto a freelance job with his old army friend, Jason. In Quanlom, a fictional Southeast Asian country, the pair are assisting the military when Mark is lured in by a group of child-soldiers, led by nine-year-old twins nicknamed "The Divine," who are intent on forcing a showdown between ancient magic and modern technology. The Divine is very loosely inspired by the real story of twins Johnny and Luther Htoo, who jointly led the God's Army guerrilla group—a splinter group of Karen National Union—in Myanmar (Burma) during the late 1990s, and who according to legends had magical powers.

The Divine was released in French by Dargaud in January 2015 under the title Le Divin. It was published in the U.S. by First Second Books, featuring a blurb by author Yann Martel. It was released in July 2015 and has hit the New York Times Best Sellers list. 

Coinciding with the book's release, the gallery exhibit The Art of The Divine opened at White Walls Gallery in San Francisco, showing sketches, rough page layouts, script pages, and prints of art from the book by Tomer Hanuka and Asaf Hanuka. The exhibit was curated by Chris Jalufka.

The Divine is to be published also in Italian, Spanish and German.

Reception
Frédéric Potet from Le Monde labeled it "A combination of Bob Morane [a popular French adventure hero], David Lynch, and Katsuhiro Otomo (Akira)". Eric Libiot from L'express compared the coloring in the book (By Tomer Hanuka) to that of Hergé, creator of Tintin. Lysiane Ganousse from L'Est Républicain wrote: "The authors have turned a chilling true story into a stunning tale", and the comics critique website, 9emeArt, gave it a rating of 10 out 10, declaring that "Even though it's only January, we can already say it's going to be one of the best releases of the year".

Publishers Weekly had chosen The Divine for "top ten graphic novel for spring 2015", describing it later on as: "Heady, hellacious, and phantasmagoric". Jesse Karp on his Booklist review wrote: "Stunning artwork and creeping dread weave together in this satisfying and moving page-turner". Michael Mechanic from Mother Jones called it "beautifully rendered", while io9 defined it as "Your next comics obsession". Rich Barrett from Mental Floss chose it for "The most interesting comics of the week" and praised it for being "stunning, cohesive combination [of elements]". Terry Hong, from The Smithsonian Asian Pacific American Center blog, wrote: "can’t-turn-away riveting [...] Unrelenting and uninterruptible", and the Eisner nominated comics blog Comics & Cola dubbed it "superb" and chose it for its pick of the month.

Overkill, 2011
A monograph collecting Hanuka's illustration work between 2000 and 2010, published by Gingko Press. Designed and edited by Anton Ioukhnovets, Overkill; a second edition was published in May 2012.

Meathaus S.O.S, 2008
A comics anthology published by Nerdcore, including the work of Hanuka and his brother Asaf, James Jean, Farel Dalrymple, Brandon Graham, Thomas Herpich, Jim Rugg, and Corey Lewis. Edited by Brandon Graham, Chris McD, and Matt Gagnon. Called "one of the best comics of the year" by New York magazine.

The Placebo Man, 2005
Publisher by Alternative Comics, The Placebo Man collects comics created from 2000 to 2005, including stories previously published in Bipolar and New Thing. 130 pages, black and white with color covers. It was translated into French by Actes Sud in 2006.

The Washington Post wrote, "Hanuka's raw, illustrative style underscores the tension and awkward fumblings toward meaning and connection that lie seething beneath the stories' surfaces."

Bipolar 1–5, 2000–2004
A five-issue comics mini series published by Alternative Comics. Co-created by Asaf and Tomer Hanuka, it's a comic book which has two parts. Asaf's side features the serializes the story "Pizzeria Kamikaze" (now collected), adapted from a book by Etgar Keret. Tomer's side is short fiction.

The Comics Journal wrote, "Each edition has conducted readers on an excursion through curious environments, full of sights that conjoin the common and the disorienting and of situations that are at once ordinary and unaccountable."

Cover illustrations

Books 
 The Gigolo Murder (Penguin)
 The Kiss Murder (Penguin)
 Hammer (W.W Norton)
 Philosophy in the Boudoir (Penguin)
 Alive in Necropolis (Riverhead Books)
 Butterfield 8 (Random House)
 Appointment is Samara (Random House)
 The Diving Pool (Random House)
 Darker Mask (Tor Books)
 The Possession of Mr. Cave (Random House)
 Fat White Vampire Blues (Ballantine Books)
 Work Book (2007)
 Everyone's Burning (Villard )
 Crime Files: Shadow Of Doubt (Scholastic)
 Crime Files: Body of Evidence (Scholastic) 
 Fallen Angels (Scholastic)
 Glory Field (Scholastic)
 The Beast (Scholastic)
 Somewhere in the Darkness (Scholastic)
 The Cubicle Survival Guide (Villard)
 Kiss Kiss / Switch Bitch / My Uncle Oswald (Quality Paperback Book Club)
 Persephone Station (Saga Press)
 The Lunar Chronicles (2020 edition)

Magazines 
 "Wage Wars," BusinessWeek 
 "Recruiting on Spring Break," The Progressive
 "The Man Behind the Curtain," The Progressive
 "Planet Earth is Dying," Stanford Medical
 "Summer Movies," The New York Times
 "Nuclear Iraq," Mother Jones
 "Terrorist?", New York Times Sunday Magazine
 "Escaping North Korea," New York Times Sunday Magazine
 "Transportation," New York Times
 "Technology," New York Times
 "George Clooney is Super Humane," Kulture Spiegel (Germany)
 "Future Eagle," Deliver
 "Direct Mail," Deliver
 "Wu Tang Clan," URB
 "Everything is Going Green," Promo

Music 
 Aesop Rock, Bazooka Tooth album cover
 Jack White, alternative cover art for Blunderbuss tour singles
 Father, You're Not Boring Anymore album cover

Comics 
 Wolverine Chop Shop (Marvel Comics)
 Un-Men (DC Comics) — 13 covers for the series
 Midnight Mass vol. I — 12 covers for the series
 Midnight Mass vol. II — 8 covers for the series
 Meathaus #3 (Meathaus Press)
 Bipolar #1, 2, 4 (Alternative Comics)
 The Big Question (Top Shelf Comics)
 New Thing: Identity (New Suit Focus)

Awards 

 2016 Society of Publication Designers — Gold Medal for "The Return of Han Solo," art-directed by Keir Novesky for Entertainment Weekly
 2016 International Manga Award — Gold Medal for The Divine
 2015 Society of Publication Designers — Gold Medal for "The Man who Discovered Mars," art-directed by Keir Novesky for Entertainment Weekly
 2010 Society of Illustrators — Silver Medal for MGMT album review, art-directed by Steven Charny for Rolling Stone
 2010  Society of Publication Designers — Silver Medal for Lost Boy," art-directed by Matthew Bates for Backpacker Magazine 2009 Academy Award nomination for Best Foreign Movie — Waltz with Bashir (Hanuka was part of the art team)
 2008 British Design Museum Award — Penguin Deluxe classic edition book covers (Hanuka's contribution to the series was the Marquis De Sade cover)
 2006 Society of Illustrators — Gold Medal
 2004 Harvey Award nomination for Best Cover Artist
 2004 Society of Illustrators — Gold Medal
 2004 Society of Publication Designers — Silver Medal
 2003 Eisner Award nomination for Best Short Story
 2002 Ignatz Award nomination for Promising New Talent
 2000 Society of Illustrators — Gold and Silver Medals 

In addition, Hanuka's work has appeared in every American Illustration annual since 2000

References

External links

 
 Interview in Haaretz'' (English, paywall), (Hebrew)

1974 births
Living people
Israeli cartoonists
Israeli comics artists
Israeli comics writers
Israeli illustrators
School of Visual Arts alumni
The New Yorker people
Israeli twins